Tusciziphius is an extinct genus of ziphiid cetaceans. The distribution includes the Miocene of Portugal and Spain, and the Pliocene of Italy and the United States. Two species are known: T. atlanticus and T. crispus.
The type specimen of T. crispus is IGF 1534, 1536, 1537, 1569, 1570, 1572, 1594 V, a partial skeleton (cerebral portion of a skull associated with the left tympanic and fragment of posterior portion of left mandibular ramus, fragment of hyoid, vertebrae, and  ribs). Its type locality is Case il Poggio, which is in a Zanclean coastal sandstone/claystone in Italy.

References

Ziphiids
Prehistoric cetacean genera
Fossil taxa described in 1997
Miocene cetaceans
Fossils of Spain
Pliocene cetaceans